Stormrise  is a real-time tactics video game developed by Creative Assembly's Australian studio and published by Sega for Microsoft Windows, PlayStation 3, and Xbox 360. It's set in a post-apocalyptic world.

Gameplay

The game is a real-time tactics game, with the ability to control units in the air, on the surface, and underground.

Story

In the near future, a network of orbital weather control satellites was created to prevent an environmental disaster. But, the satellites malfunctioned triggering a catastrophic event known as simply "The Event", in which firestorms ravaged the surface of the Earth. A select few were chosen to go into cryogenic stasis and rebuild society, while the rest were left to die. After a few decades, two civilizations began to emerge. Those who went into stasis would reawaken and form the technologically advanced Echelon, while those who were left behind would adapt to the new environment and become the tribal Sai.

Factions

The Echelon: A technologically advanced race that endured the planet's fallout by way of cryogenic stasis.

The Sai: A tribal society that adapted to the new environment and evolved.

Development
Stormrise was in development at Creative Assembly's Australian studio and was released for the Xbox 360, Microsoft Windows, and PlayStation 3 in March 2009. The Windows version requires Windows Vista as the engine has been built on and designed around DirectX 10.1.

Critical reception

The PlayStation 3 version received "mixed" reviews, while the PC and Xbox 360 versions received "generally unfavorable reviews", according to the review aggregation website Metacritic.

Patch cancellation and departure of staff
Development of the second patch was cancelled on 28 April 2009 one month after release. Creative Assembly indicated that the cancellation was due to the financial costs involved, stating "The second patch that has been worked on by Creative Assembly Australia will not make it into the hands of the Stormrise players, due to costs and risks associated with testing and certifying the new changes and features."

The critical response and low sales have been cited as being factors in the financial decision.

Following the cancellation of the patch, Ken Turner, the creative director behind Stormrise, was released from the studio.

References

External links
 

2009 video games
PlayStation 3 games
Xbox 360 games
Real-time tactics video games
Sega video games
Video games developed in Australia
Creative Assembly games
Windows games
Games for Windows certified games
Multiplayer and single-player video games
Video games scored by Jeff van Dyck